Sangar is a town in Ghazni Province, Afghanistan. It is the center of Ajristan district and is located at an altitude of  2,623 m in the narrow valley formed by the Jikhai River.

See also 
 Ajristan District
 Ghazni Province

Notes 

Populated places in Ghazni Province